The Arc is an  long river in Southern France. It then passes through Aix-en-Provence before flowing into the Étang de Berre, a lagoon connected with the Mediterranean Sea to the west of Marseille. The Bayeux, the Cause and the Torse are its tributaries.

The Roquefavour Aqueduct passes over the river; Paul Cézanne's Mont Sainte-Victoire and the Viaduct of the Arc River Valley is the best known piece of art representing the Arc.

References

Rivers of France
Rivers of Bouches-du-Rhône
Rivers of Var (department)
Rivers of Provence-Alpes-Côte d'Azur